The Living End is a 1992 American comedy-drama film by Gregg Araki. Described by some critics as a "gay Thelma and Louise," the film is an early entry in the New Queer Cinema genre. The Living End was nominated for a Grand Jury Prize at the Sundance Film Festival in 1992.

Plot
Luke is a restless and reckless drifter and Jon is a relatively timid and pessimistic film critic. Both are gay and HIV positive. After an unconventional meeting, and after Luke kills a homophobic police officer, they go on a road trip with the motto "Fuck everything."

Cast
 Mike Dytri as Luke
 Craig Gilmore as Jon
 Mark Finch as Doctor
 Mary Woronov as Daisy
 Johanna Went as Fern
 Darcy Marta as Darcy
 Scot Goetz as Peter
 Bretton Vail as Ken
 Nicole Dillenberg as Barbie
 Stephen Holman and Magie Song as the 7-11 couple
 Peter Lanigan, Jon Gerrans, and Jack Kofman as Three Stooges
 Chris Mabli as a Neo-Nazi
 Michael Now as Tarzan
 Michael Haynes as Jane
 Peter Grame as Gus
 Craig Lee and Torie Chickering as the arguing couple at Ralph's
 Jordan Beswick as Buddhist
 Paul Bartel as Twister master

Music
The film's soundtrack is mostly industrial, post punk and shoegaze music. Many references to bands and their members are made throughout the film. Joy Division's Ian Curtis is mentioned, along with Dead Can Dance, Echo & the Bunnymen and others. A Nine Inch Nails sticker is on the dashboard of Jon's car. The film's title comes from a song by The Jesus and Mary Chain, and a cover version of the JAMC song is performed by Wax Trax! Records artists Braindead Soundmachine during the film's credits. Early in the movie, Luke is seen wearing a JAMC shirt.

The film features music by the industrial bands Coil, KMFDM, and Braindead Soundmachine. Braindead Soundmachine guitarist Cole Coonce is credited with scoring the film's original music.

Reception
 

Janet Maslin of The New York Times found The Living End to be "a candid, freewheeling road movie" with "the power of honesty and originality, as well as the weight of legitimate frustration. Miraculously, it also has a buoyant, mischievous spirit that transcends any hint of gloom." She praised Araki for his solid grasp on his lead characters' plight and for not trivializing it or inventing an easy ending. Conversely, Rita Kempley for The Washington Post called the film pretentious and Araki a "cinematic poseur" along the lines of Jean-Luc Godard and Andy Warhol. The Living End, she concluded, "is mostly annoying". [[Rolling Stone|Rolling Stone'''s]] Peter Travers found The Living End a "savagely funny, sexy and grieving cry" made more heart-rending by "Hollywood's gutless fear of AIDS movies". The Star Observer'' praised the movie, calling it "a vicious punch in the guts that leaves you uncomfortably winded and unforgettably moved".

In a letter (dated September 25, 1992) to playwright Robert Patrick, LGBT writer and actor Quentin Crisp called the film "dreadful."

References

External links
 
 

1992 films
1992 LGBT-related films
American LGBT-related films
1990s English-language films
Films directed by Gregg Araki
Films shot in Los Angeles
HIV/AIDS in American films
American independent films
1990s road comedy-drama films
American road comedy-drama films
1992 independent films
LGBT-related black comedy films
LGBT-related comedy-drama films
Gay-related films
1990s American films